Drösing is a town in the district of Gänserndorf in the Austrian state of Lower Austria.

Geography
Drösing lies near Vienna on the March River on the Slovakian border. About 25.7 percent of the municipality is forested.

Subdivisions

 Drösing
 Waltersdorf an der March

References

Cities and towns in Gänserndorf District